Cabras Island was historically a low-lying finger of land off the coast of Piti, Guam that formed part of the northern protective arm of Apra Harbor. Shortly after the 1944 Battle of Guam it was connected by a causeway to the mainland and extended by the Glass Breakwater, and is now typically referred to simply as Cabras. Cabras houses both the Port of Guam and the primary Guam Power Authority generators supplying Guam. It lends its name to both a small vessel Cabras Marina, near the mainland, and the large vessel Cabras Channel, connecting the port to the deeper waters of the middle harbor.

History

A corruption of the CHamoru name for Cabras, apapa, meaning "low", gives Apra Harbor its name. Before the twentieth century, Apra Harbor was protected by the Guam mainland to the east; Cabras Island, Luminao Reef, and Calalan Bank to the north; and Orote Peninsula to the south. After Spanish improvements to the harbor in the 1700s, Piti became the main port, with the only real road connecting Piti to the capital of Hagåtña to the north. The reef separating Cabras Island from the mainland was exposed at low tide and easily crossable by foot. The island was used for a quarantine camp.

Among the improvements recommended by a 1930s board headed by Rear Admiral Arthur Japy Hepburn in the run-up to World War II was a breakwater upon Luminao Reef to the west of Cabras Island. Construction began in August 1941. Limestone blocks quarried at Cabras Island were skidded along the reef to an improvised derrick. By the time of the Japanese invasion in December 1941, one mile of breakwater, 36 feet wide five-feet above sea level had been constructed. The northern arm of Apra Harbor, from the main island through Cabras to the tip of the breakwater at Spanish Rocks measured .

In 1964, the Commander Naval Forces Marianas proposed that the commercial port be moved out of Inner Apra Harbor on Naval Base Guam to a new location on Cabras. Much of the funding for the Port of Guam facility came through the Guam Rehabilitation Act of 1963, passed by Congress to rebuild the island after the devastation of Typhoon Karen. The new port was completed in June 1969.

The breakwater road is sometimes closed for security reasons during visits by ships. The island is also used for snorkeling and watersports.

References

Geography of Guam
Islands of Guam
Piti, Guam
Apra Harbor